Zack Lee (born 15 August 1984) is an Indonesian actor, model and boxer of British descent.

Career
Zack Lee Jowono began his career as a model before appearing in soap operas in the mid 2000s. His most memorable role in the 2005 action movie Bad Wolves, as the leader of a bloodthirsty gang, won him favorable reviews.

In 2013 Lee earned a role in The Raid 2: Berandal which premiered at Sundance Film Festival 2014 and was released in Indonesia and United States in the same year. In 2016, he starred in Headshot which premiered at Midnight Madness Toronto International Film Festival 2016. Later in 2018, he starred in Buffalo Boys which became Singapore’s official entry for 91st Academy Awards for Best Foreign Language Film. He also starred in the HBO Asia Original Series, Grisse. Zack is possibly best known from The Night Comes for Us which premiered in Fantastic Fest 2018 and became the first Netflix Original Feature from Indonesia.

Besides acting, Lee is also passionate about food and cooking. He and his family are also food entrepreneurs. He also owns a noodle shop called Bakmi Omlee.

Personal life
Lee was born in Liverpool to a British mother and an Indonesian father with  Chinese descent. He is the second in a family of five children, brought up as a Buddhist. After the divorce of his parents when he was three, Zack went to live with his father in Jakarta. He converted to Christianity when he was 19 years old.  He married Nafa Urbach in 2015, That same year, the couple went to Jerusalem to perform a religious pilgrimage, as part of their honeymoon. The couple have one daughter.

Filmography

Film
 Bad Wolves (2005)
 Drown Boy, Drown (2008)
 The Raid 2: Berandal (2014)
 Wanita Berdarah (2014)
 Midnight Show (2015)
 Headshot (2016)
 The Night Comes for Us (2018)
 Buffalo Boys (2018)
 Jaga Pocong (2018)
 Gundala (2019)
 EXILED: The Chosen Ones (2022)

FTV
 You've Got Ism@il (2011) with Sabai Morscheck
 Kucari Namamu (2011) with Roger Danuarta
 Suamiku Direbut Teman Kuliahnya (2014) with Ririn Dwi Ariyanti
 Aku Dewi Bukan Dewo (2015) with Irene Librawati
 Bali Moon (2015) with Jerry Lawalata

Television
 Ilalang Sepanjang Jalan 
 Preman Kampus 
 Kugapai Cintamu 
 Gadis 
 Ilalang 
 Karnaval 
 Manusia Harimau

See also
Indo people
List of converts to Christianity

References

https://www.kompasiana.com/yonathan90/5bcf6a4fbde57526d64d8042/the-night-comes-for-us-ambisius-brutal-penuh-aksi-mendebarkan?page=all

External links
  Profil Zack Lee Kapanlagi.com
 

 https://www.youtube.com/watch?v=iksiwRO8lkM

1984 births
Living people
Boxers from Liverpool
Indo people
Indonesian people of English descent
Indonesian people of Chinese descent
Javanese people
Indonesian actors
Male actors from Liverpool
Indonesian male film actors
Indonesian male boxers
Action choreographers
Indonesian Christians
Indonesian Protestants
Converts to Protestantism from Buddhism